() is the lowest Junior officer rank in the armed forces of Germany (Bundeswehr), the Austrian Armed Forces, and the military of Switzerland.

History

The German noun (with the meaning "" (in English "deputy") from Middle High German «locum tenens»  (in English "place holder") was derived from the French word  about 1500. In most German-speaking armies it is the lowest officer rank (in German-speaking navies  (English "Lieutenant at sea")). In the German Bundeswehr the ranks  and  belong to the  rank group. In some other armed forces (such as the former National People's Army) there is the lower grade of Unterleutnant.

With the formation of standing armies in the second half of the 17th century, the term commonly came to designate the rank of the least senior commissioned officer.

In the 18th and 19th century, at the unit level several  served as platoon leaders.

Austria 

Mandatory to be promoted to that rank is a six terms course of high school studies (until August 2008 eight terms) with 180 ECTS points on the Theresian Military Academy in the Wiener Neustadt. The studies are focused on "Military Command and Control" (C2) and the academy-leaver graduate to Bachelor.

The career in the Militia is structured in a different way. Here the modular education comprises the so-called one-year volunteer year (de:  [EF]) as well as several courses, seminars, and exercises with a final aptitude test. After an overall service time of five years the promotion to «Leutnant» is possible.

Moreover, the appointment designation  is possible for leading officials (E1) of the Austrian executive, e.g. the Austrian Federal Police and prison authority personnel.

Austro-Hungarian Army 

Germany 

The rank of  has been used in the German armed forces since 1899.

Bundeswehr 

In the  today, a  will be normally appointed as platoon leader. However, the rank of  might also be held while a junior officer is studying at the University of the German Federal Armed Forces or at another training or education establishment. The  of the  belongs to the " rank group" (also: subaltern officer rank group).

Rank 
In Germany,  (short.: Lt / on lists also: L) is the designation of a soldier of the lowest officer rank.

Soldiers with that particular rank, are mandated and authorized to provide military orders as to the so-called Superior-subordinate relations to private ranks (de: Mannschaften), NCOs without port épée (de: Unteroffiziere ohne port épée), as well as to Senior NCOs with port épée (de: Unteroffizier mit port épée).

National People's Army 

In the GDR National People's Army (NPA) the rank  was the second lowest commissioned offer (CO) rank until 1990. This was in reference to Soviet military doctrine and in line with other armed forces of the Warsaw Pact.

In reference to the Soviet armed forces and to other armed forces of the Warsaw pact  was the second lowest officer rank until 1990.

Nazi Germany 

Switzerland 

Promotion to the next highest rank, occurs after three refresher courses (contingent upon good performance) or automatically after six years' service. 

For missions outside of Switzerland, the rank  will be designated in English as Second lieutenant.

Swiss Guard

References 

 Die Streitkräfte der Republik Österreich, 1918-1968, Heeresgeschichtliches Museum, Militärwissenschaftliches Institut, 1968.

Military ranks of Austria
Military ranks of Switzerland
Austro-Hungarian Army
Military ranks of Germany